Schwab or Schwabe may refer to:

 Schwab (surname)
 Schwabe, a surname
 Schwabe (crater), a small lunar crater
 Schwabe (publisher), the oldest printing and publishing house in the world
 Charles Schwab Corporation, American stockbroker and electronic trading platform also known as Schwab, founded by Charles R. Schwab Sr.

Places 
 Schwab, California, former name of Schwaub, California
 Swabia (Schwaben), a cultural, historic and linguistic region in southwestern Germany
 Schwab's Pharmacy, a famous drugstore in Hollywood, CS

See also
 Charles Schwab Corporation, stock brokerage
 Camp Schwab, US Marine Corps, in Okinawa, Japan
 Schwab Cup, a contract bridge trophy competed for in 1933 and 1934 between UK and U.S.A.; see Ely Culbertson
 Schwabe, Williamson & Wyatt, law firm
 Schwob, a surname